Nada Polić (born 6 September 1959), better known as Ana Bekuta (Ана Бекута), is a Serbian singer. Born in Priboj and raised in the village of Banja, she began her music career in 1974 by competing on the music festival 'Prvi glas Priboja' (The First Voice of Priboj), where she finished as the runner-up. In the following years, Polić started singing professionally as a hotel lounge singer.

Under the stage name 'Ana Bekuta', she made her recording debut in 1985 with the release of her first album under PGP-RTB. Over the years she has collectively released twenty one studio albums. In 2011, Bekuta began performing annually at the Belgrade's Sava Centar. For her work in folk music, she has received numerous accolades, including the Charter of the Cultural and Educational Community in 2015 and the National Music Artist of Serbia award from the Union of the Music Artists of Serbia (SEMUS) in 2020. In addition to her singing career, in 2014 Bekuta became a judge and later a mentor on the singing competition show Zvezde Granda.

At the age of 17, Polić became a mother to a son, named Igor. She was in a relationship with Serbian politician Milutin Mrkonjić between 2012 and his death in 2021.

Discography
Studio albums
 Ti si mene varao (1985)
 Ti mi trebaš (1986)
 Samo ti (1987)
 Uvek postoji nada (1988)
 Stani, stani zoro (1989)
 Tu sam ruku da ti prižim (1990)
 Pitaš kako živim (1993)
 Taj život moj (1995)
 Opet imam razloga da živim (1996)
 Sve je bolje od samoće (1998)
 Kriv si samo ti (1999)
 Svirajte mi onu pesmu (2001)
 Dve suze (2003)
 Brojanica (2005)
 Manite se ljudi (2006)
 Blago meni (2009)
 Hvala ljubavi (2013)
 Ime sreće (2018)

See also
Music of Serbia
Serbian folk music

References

External links
 
 

20th-century Serbian women singers
Serbian folk-pop singers
Serbian folk singers
People from Priboj
21st-century Serbian women singers
Yugoslav women singers
1959 births
Living people
Beovizija contestants